Andrew W. Lewis (5 September 1943 – 24 October 2017) was an American historian and professor at Missouri State University. His areas of interest were medieval Europe and the Renaissance.

Awards and honors
 Session 8: Autour du livre d'Andrew Lewis, Le Sang royal. La famille capétienne et l'Etat, France, Xe-XIVe siècles/ Royal Succession in Capetian France: Studies on Familial Order and the State, 1981
 MacArthur Fellows Program, 1984.
 John Nicholas Brown Prize, 1985.
 John D. and Catherine T. MacArthur Foundation, 1984–1989.
 International Medieval Society Annual Symposium, June 2008.

Works
"Anticipatory Association of the Heir in Early Capetian France", The American Historical Review 83.4 (October 1978:906-927)
"The Capetian apanages and the nature of the French kingdom ", Journal of Medieval History, Volume 2, Issue 2, June 1976, Pages 119-134
Royal succession in Capetian France: studies on familial order and the state, Harvard University Press, 1981, 
"The Birth and Childhood of King John: Some Revisions," Eleanor of Aquitaine; Lord and Lady, Edited Bonnie Wheeler, John C. Parsons, Palgrave Macmillan, January 2003, 
 English translation of French chronicler Bernard Itier's The chronicle and historical notes of Bernard Itier

References

Sources
 

1943 births
2017 deaths
American medievalists
Missouri State University faculty
MacArthur Fellows
Harvard University alumni
University of Chicago alumni
Dartmouth College alumni
People from Savannah, Georgia